State Route 177 (SR 177) is part of Maine's system of numbered state highways, located in Hancock County. It runs from SR 175 in Penobscot to SR 15, SR 172, and SR 176 in Blue Hill.

Route description
SR 177 begins at SR 175 in Penobscot. The route heads east towards the intersections with Tamworth Farm Road and Hinckley Ridge Road. SR 177 follows Hinckley Ridge Road south towards the intersection with Union Street and Beech Hill Road. Then, the route follows Union Street towards its eastern terminus at Blue Hill.

Major junctions

References

External links

Floodgap Roadgap's RoadsAroundME: Maine State Route 177

177
Transportation in Hancock County, Maine